Ludwig Georg Elias Moses Bieberbach (4 December 1886 – 1 September 1982) was a German mathematician and Nazi.

Biography
Born in Goddelau, near Darmstadt, he studied at Heidelberg and under Felix Klein at Göttingen, receiving his doctorate in 1910. His dissertation was titled On the theory of automorphic functions. He began working as a Privatdozent at Königsberg in 1910 and as Professor ordinarius at the University of Basel in 1913. He taught at the University of Frankfurt in 1915 and the University of Berlin from 1921–45.

Bieberbach wrote a habilitation thesis in 1911 about groups of Euclidean motions – identifying conditions under which the group must have a translational subgroup whose vectors span the Euclidean space – that helped solve Hilbert's 18th problem. He worked on complex analysis and its applications to other areas in mathematics. He is known for his work on dynamics in several complex variables, where he obtained results similar to Fatou's. In 1916 he formulated the Bieberbach conjecture, stating a necessary condition for a holomorphic function to map the open unit disc injectively into the complex plane in terms of the function's Taylor series. In 1984 Louis de Branges proved the conjecture (for this reason, the Bieberbach conjecture is sometimes called de Branges' theorem). In 1928 Bieberbach wrote a book with Issai Schur titled Über die Minkowskische Reduktiontheorie der positiven quadratischen Formen.

Bieberbach was a speaker at the International Congress of Mathematicians held at Zurich in 1932.

Politics
Bieberbach joined the Sturmabteilung in 1933 and the NSDAP in 1937. He was enthusiastically involved in the efforts to dismiss  his Jewish colleagues, including Edmund Landau and his former coauthor Issai Schur, from their posts. He also facilitated the Gestapo arrests of some close colleagues, such as Juliusz Schauder. Bieberbach was heavily influenced by Theodore Vahlen, another German mathematician and anti-Semite, who along with Bieberbach founded the "Deutsche Mathematik" ("German mathematics") movement and journal of the same name. The purpose of the movement was to encourage and promote a "German" (in this case meaning intuitionistic) style in mathematics. For example, Bieberbach claimed that "the Cauchy–Goursat theorem arouses intolerable displeasure" in Germans, and was representative of an abstract style of reasoning and "pronounced shrewdness" characteristic of "Jewish mathematics". Bieberbach's and Vahlen's idea of German mathematics was part of a wider trend in the scientific community in Nazi Germany towards giving the sciences racial character; there were also pseudoscientific movements for "Deutsche Physik", "German chemistry", and "German biology".

In 1945, Bieberbach was dismissed from all his academic positions because of his support of Nazism, but in 1949 was invited to lecture at the University of Basel by Ostrowski, who considered Bieberbach's political views irrelevant to his contributions to the field of mathematics.

See also
Angle trisection
Periodic graph (geometry)
Topological rigidity

References

External links
 Author profile in the database zbMATH

Further reading

1886 births
1982 deaths
People from Groß-Gerau (district)
People from the Grand Duchy of Hesse
Nazi Party members
20th-century German mathematicians
Heidelberg University alumni
University of Göttingen alumni
Academic staff of the University of Königsberg
Academic staff of the University of Basel
Academic staff of Goethe University Frankfurt
Academic staff of the Humboldt University of Berlin
Members of the Prussian Academy of Sciences